Canadian Division may refer to:

Sports
 North Division (NHL), the current all-Canadian division of the National Hockey League
 Canadian Division (NHL), a former division of the NHL
 North Division (CFL), a former Canada-wide division of the Canadian Football League

Military
 1st Canadian Division
 2nd Canadian Division
 3rd Canadian Division
 4th Canadian Division
 5th Canadian Division
 6th Canadian Division
 7th Canadian Infantry Division
 8th Canadian Infantry Division

See also
 List of Canadian divisions in World War I
 List of Canadian divisions in World War II